The Battle of Mojkovac was a World War I battle fought between 6 January and 7 January 1916 near Mojkovac, in today's Montenegro, between the armies of Austria-Hungary and the Kingdom of Montenegro. It ended with a decisive Montenegrin victory.

Prelude
In the winter of 1915, the Montenegrin Army had been fighting the Austro-Hungarian Army for three months in Serbia. In January 1916 they had to resist the invasion of their own territory. The Montenegrin Army was weakened by the harsh weather and lack of supplies. On 5 January 1916, they received a command to protect the retreat of the Royal Serbian Army to Corfu in Greece via Albania. Savo Lazarević was commander of Montenegrin Royal Gendarmerie which was part of Čakor Detachment during the Battle of Mojkovac.

Battle

The fighting culminated on 6 and 7 January 1916 (on Orthodox Christmas; also known as 'Bloody Christmas'). Led by Serdar (Vojvoda) Janko Vukotić with Krsto Popović as second in command, the Montenegrins inflicted heavy casualties on the Austro-Hungarians and temporarily halted their advancement.

The Montenegrin forces had entrenched themselves around the village of Mojkovac. Austro-Hungarian Army attacked Montenegrin positions early that day along with a heavy artillery bombardment on Mojkovac itself. By noon, the Austro-Hungarian attack was repulsed, suffering heavy casualties. Fighting resumed from then on, until the Austro-Hungarian forces left the battlefield, leaving more than 2,000 of their soldiers dead. By the end of the day, Montenegrin forces were able to push back multiple attacks made by Austro-Hungarian forces, taking back control of Mojkovac and its surroundings. Much of the fighting was done hand-to-hand with fixed bayonets and knives, in knee-deep snow.

On 7 January, the Austro-Hungarians launched a second attack on Montenegrin positions. The attack again failed, with heavy losses on both sides. Despite having a much stronger, larger, and better-equipped army, Austro-Hungarian forces abandoned their positions in Mojkovac on the 7th and retreated.

Results
There is considerable disagreement about the actual conduct of the battle, but the Montenegrins forced a numerically superior foe to retreat. The battle was intended to give the Royal Serbian Army enough time reach the Albanian mountains in their retreat to Corfu, but in fact most of the Serbian troops had already crossed the mountains and reached the coast and were battling their way south between Scutari (Shkodër) and Durazzo (Durrës).

The Montenegrin forces continued to hold the Berane-Andrijevica-Mojkovac-Tara River line until withdrawing on 18 January. The Austrians then continued pushing their offensive south.

In the meantime, the Austro-Hungarians had already taken Mount Lovćen (11/1), the capital Cetinje (13/1), Peć and Berane (10/1).

Some historians indicate that at the time of the battle King Nicholas was already in surrender negotiations and that several units had already surrendered, but others hold that King Nicholas did not agree to negotiate until 12 January.  However, by 25 January the entire army of Montenegro had laid down its weapons.

Generalmajor Reinöhl said of the battle: "The courage of the Montenegrin soldier has no equal in the history of wars. Here you could see the Montenegrin soldier attacking the bayonets of the enemy with his bare hands. That numerically small army, armed with primitive weapons, on the terrain of Mojkovac for days stopped the much more numerous Austro-Hungarian Army, equipped with modern arms."

See also
 Serbian campaign

Notes

References
 
 Cyril Falls, The Great War, p. 140
 

Mojkovac
Mojkovac
Mojkovac
Mojkovac
Mojkovac
Mojkovac
Mojkovac
Mojkovac
January 1916 events
Mojkovac